Stéphane Risacher (born 26 August 1972 in Moulins, Allier) is a basketball player from France, who won the silver medal at the 2000 Summer Olympics with the Men's National Team.

References
Euroleague Statistics

Sportspeople from Moulins, Allier
1972 births
Living people
Basket CRO Lyon players
Basketball players at the 2000 Summer Olympics
Baloncesto Málaga players
CB Murcia players
Centre Fédéral de Basket-ball players
Élan Béarnais players
French men's basketball players
French expatriate sportspeople in Spain
Liga ACB players
Olympic basketball players of France
Olympic medalists in basketball
Olympic silver medalists for France
Medalists at the 2000 Summer Olympics
Paris Racing Basket players